Sai Kiran Adivi is an Indian Telugu film director & writer.

Career
Sai Kiran first worked as an assistant director to Sekhar Kammula. He made his debut as a director with Vinayakudu (2008), starring Krishnudu in the lead role. His next film was Village Lo Vinayakudu, the sequel to Vinayakudu. In 2015, Sai Kiran Adivi directed a romantic entertainer, Kerintha, which was produced by Dil Raju. His latest movie, Operation Gold Fish, released in October 2019. He is the cousin of actor  Adivi Sesh

Filmography

References

External links 
 Sai Kiran Adivi blog on Vinayakudu - Idlebrain.com

Telugu film directors
Living people
1976 births